Kenneth Franklin Weaver (November 29, 1915 – September 20, 2010) enjoyed a substantial 33-year career as a writer for  the National Geographic Magazine. His prolific tenure with National Geographic produced articles encompassing a range of subjects until he retired as Senior Science Editor in 1985.

Career
In 1952, Weaver was hired at The National Geographic in the legends department. "Legends" were, in fact, the captions that accompanied the innovative, often exotic photography that the Geographic pioneered at that time. Weaver's work was widely viewed, as the majority of Geographic subscribers primarily opened the magazine to peruse the pictures. Within the legends department, Weaver thrived, and he was quickly promoted to Staff Writer. His first Geographic article, entitled "Rip Van Winkle of the Underground: North America's Much Misunderstood Insect, the Periodical Cicada, Emerges After 17 Years in the Earth for a Fling in the Sun", was published in July 1953.

Weaver's career is particularly notable for his coverage of the NASA space program, when he authored titles including "Countdown for Space" in May 1961, "And Now to Touch the Moon's Forbidding Face", May 1969, and "Journey to Mars", February 1973. Weaver's articles were translated in many languages, bringing together people whose existences were drastically different, but who shared a single fascination with a subject that went beyond any cultural or political disparity at that time (most importantly, the Cold War space race between the US and Soviet Union).

All told, Weaver wrote 37 stories for The National Geographic, mostly within the Science beat. Upon his retirement, he wrote his last piece for the Geographic's November 1985 issue, entitled "The Search for Our Ancestors: Stones, Bones, and Early Man." It was the magazine's cover story that month, with a three-dimensional hologram  depicting an ancient fossilized skull of a five-year-old child, preserved for more than a million years in a South African cave.

List of articles

References

External links
Kenneth Weaver's obituary

American magazine editors
American science writers
Science journalists
1915 births
2010 deaths